Mohammadabad-e Alam (also Romanized as Moḩammadābād-e ʿAlam) is a village in Mahyar Rural District, in the Central District of Qaen County, South Khorasan Province, Iran. At the 2006 census, its population was 1,395, in 323 families.

References 

Populated places in Qaen County